Sanson is a small settlement in the Manawatu District of New Zealand. It is located just south of Bulls and the Rangitikei River, and west of the city of Palmerston North.

Two major roads of the New Zealand state highway network meet in Sanson, State Highways 1 and 3. From 1885 until 1945, the Sanson Tramway provided a link with the national rail network, running south to meet the now-closed Foxton Branch in Himatangi.

History

European settlement in the area began with the New Zealand Government's sale of the Sandon Block in the late 1860s. The block was designated an urban township rather than a rural block, as soldiers were not permitted to buy urban land.

The Sandon block was settled from the Hutt Valley, and named after Hutt Small Farm Association secretary Henry Sanson.

A photo in the National Library of New Zealand shows the settlement in the 1870s, with a few houses, a church and some other buildings on a single main road. Another photograph shows the church alongside a two-storied house, with a picket fence and a horse tied to a gate.

The township of Sanson was the terminus of a tramway, with ran from a junction with the railway line at Hīmatangi from 1883 to 1945.

The tram line is depicted in a photograph in the early 20th century. On one side of the tram line are wooden buildings; on the other is an unpaved street, a two-storey store, and a local hotel.

By 2006, the town was a highway stop with several craft and antique shops.

Demographics

The population of Sanson was 588 in the 2018 New Zealand census, an increase of 51 (9.5%) since the 2013 census, and an increase of 96 (19.5%) since the 2006 census. There were 312 males and 273 females, giving a sex ratio of 1.14 males per female. Ethnicities were 489 people  (83.2%) European/Pākehā, 150 (25.5%) Māori, 21 (3.6%) Pacific peoples, and 27 (4.6%) Asian (totals add to more than 100% since people could identify with multiple ethnicities). Of the total population, 120 people  (20.4%) were under 15 years old, 87 (14.8%) were 15–29, 288 (49.0%) were 30–64, and 93 (15.8%) were over 65.

Ohakea-Sanson

Ohakea-Sanson, which also covers Ohakea, had a population of 1,290 at the 2018 New Zealand census, an increase of 60 people (4.9%) since the 2013 census, and an increase of 168 people (15.0%) since the 2006 census. There were 474 households. There were 714 males and 576 females, giving a sex ratio of 1.24 males per female. The median age was 35.4 years (compared with 37.4 years nationally), with 258 people (20.0%) aged under 15 years, 303 (23.5%) aged 15 to 29, 582 (45.1%) aged 30 to 64, and 150 (11.6%) aged 65 or older.

Ethnicities were 86.7% European/Pākehā, 18.4% Māori, 2.3% Pacific peoples, 4.2% Asian, and 4.4% other ethnicities (totals add to more than 100% since people could identify with multiple ethnicities).

The proportion of people born overseas was 11.6%, compared with 27.1% nationally.

Although some people objected to giving their religion, 60.0% had no religion, 27.0% were Christian, 0.9% were Muslim and 4.9% had other religions.

Of those at least 15 years old, 144 (14.0%) people had a bachelor or higher degree, and 192 (18.6%) people had no formal qualifications. The median income was $40,100, compared with $31,800 nationally. The employment status of those at least 15 was that 645 (62.5%) people were employed full-time, 144 (14.0%) were part-time, and 27 (2.6%) were unemployed.

Education

Sanson School, having relocated in 1991 to what was the Manawatu County Council building (which upon moving premises, later to become the Manawatu District Council in Feilding) lies at the southern end of the township off State Highway 1.

At the front of the old Sanson School building, located on State Highway 3 on the western boundary of the township (Dundas Road) is the Sanson Memorial Gate; erected to the memory of soldiers who died in World War I.  It was unveiled on 31 August 1924 and lists the names of twelve deceased soldiers.

References

Manawatu District
Populated places in Manawatū-Whanganui